Senator Hawks may refer to:

Bill Hawks (born 1944), Mississippi State Senate
Bob Hawks (Montana politician) (born 1941), Montana State Senate